Mister Sterling is an American serial drama television series created by Lawrence O'Donnell for NBC. The series ran from January 10 to March 14, 2003. Starring Josh Brolin as an idealistic United States Senator, the series featured Audra McDonald, William Russ, David Noroña, and James Whitmore as members of his staff. Despite mostly positive reviews, the series aired on Friday nights. It was cancelled after 10 episodes after the show only ranked 58th in the yearly ratings (9.83 million viewers, 6.7/12 rating/share)

Although it had numerous similarities to The West Wing in style and tone (especially the show's idealistic attitude towards politics) and the unnamed president in the series is stated to be a Democrat, it was not set in the same universe as O'Donnell's other political show. It is unknown if a cross-over would have ever occurred had Mister Sterling not been cancelled; however Steven Culp played presidential aspirant Sen. Ron Garland on Mister Sterling and House Speaker Jeff Haffley on The West Wing, and Democrats appeared to be in the majority in the US Senate on Mr Sterling, while in The West Wing consistent Republican control of both Houses of Congress was a key plot point.

James Whitmore was nominated for a 2003 Emmy Award for Outstanding Guest Actor in a Drama Series for playing former Governor Bill Sterling, the senator's father.

The series was produced by Bernadette Joyce, co-producer; Garry A. Brown, co-producer; Michael Dinner, co-executive producer; Sandy Frank, co-producer; Jim Hart, co-executive producer; Jeff Melvoin, co-executive producer; Andrea Newman, producer; Lawrence O'Donnell, executive producer; Chip Vucelich, co-producer; William Bradley, consulting producer.

Cast
 Josh Brolin as Bill Sterling
 Audra McDonald as Jackie Brock 
 William Russ as Tommy Doyle 
 David Norona as Leon Montero
 James Whitmore as Bill Sterling, Sr. (recurring role)

Characters

Senator Sterling's office
Senator Bill Sterling (I-California)
Chief of Staff Jackie Brock
Legislative Director Tommy Doyle
Legislative Assistant Leon Montero
Secretary Pat Conway (Dale Raoul)
Deputy Press Secretary Derek Larner (Dean Cameron)

Senators
Senator Albert Bailey (D-CA) 
Sterling was appointed to his seat after Bailey died of a heart attack.
Senator Burt Gammel (R-Louisiana)
Senate Minority Leader
Senate Majority Leader (D-New Mexico)
Senator Dan Wilson (D-Illinois)
Senator Jack "Thunder Hawk" Jackson (R-Arizona)
Senator Kate Robertson (Nevada)
Elected in 1998.
Senator Millman
Senator Ron Garland (R-Ohio)
Running for the Presidency.
Senator Bowles
Senator Dave Crandall (D-Delaware)
Senator Roger Morris (D)
Senator Andersen
Senator Buckley
Senator Burke
Senator Carver
Senator Gilmartin
Senator Lane
Senator Eaton
Senator Porter
Senator Preston
Senator Raymond
Senator Smith
Senator Stanton
Senator Stewart
Senator Taylor
Senator Trimble
Senator Troy
Senator Grayson

Governors
Governor Carl Marino (D-CA)
Former Governor William Sterling (D-CA)

Lobbyist
Barry Reed

Democratic leadership
Arthur Peyton, Executive Director of the Democratic Senatorial Campaign Committee, former Chief of Staff to Senator Bailey (D-CA)

Senate contenders
This is a list of candidates who are running for the U.S. Senate seat currently held by Bill Sterling:

Democrat
Anthony Marino, son of the Governor (D-CA)
Chuck Stanley, millionaire (D-CA)
G.M. Clooney, coffee maker (D-CA)

Republican
Sarah Burwell (R-CA)
Congressman Bob "The Bomber" Brennan (R-CA)

Other
Lauren Barnes, Actress
Laura Chandler, Reporter (Chandra West)
Rebecca Everton, Assistant Secretary of Housing and Urban Development

Episodes

References
 "Testing Our Mettle", review by Andrew Stuttaford, National Review, January 31, 2003 
 "Mister Sterling", reviewed by Ken Tucker, Entertainment Weekly, January 17, 2003
 "Sterling silver" by Heather Havrilesky, Salon.com Magazine, February 27, 2003

External links 
 

2000s American drama television series
2003 American television series debuts
2003 American television series endings
NBC original programming
Television shows set in Washington, D.C.
2000s American political television series
Television series by Universal Television